The 1983 Long Beach State 49ers football team represented California State University, Long Beach during the 1983 NCAA Division I-A football season.

Cal State Long Beach competed in the Pacific Coast Athletic Association. The team was led by seventh-year head coach Dave Currey, and played home games at Veterans Stadium adjacent to the campus of Long Beach City College in Long Beach, California, with one game at Anaheim Stadium in Anaheim, California . They finished the season with a record of eight wins and four losses (8–4, 3–3 PCAA).

Schedule

Team players in the NFL
The following were selected in the 1984 NFL Draft.

The following finished their Cal State Long Beach career in 1983, were not drafted, but played in the NFL.

Notes

References

Long Beach State
Long Beach State 49ers football seasons
Long Beach State 49ers football